Civilian Conservation Corps Quarry No. 2 is a historic Civilian Conservation Corps (CCC) quarry site located near Pickens, Pickens County, South Carolina.  The site is associated with the CCC construction of Table Rock State Park between 1935 and 1941.  It is one of four quarry sites used for materials in the construction of park structures and facilities at the park.  Located on the property is a concrete spring house built by CCC workers.

It was listed on the National Register of Historic Places in 1989.

References 

Quarries in the United States
Civilian Conservation Corps in South Carolina
National Register of Historic Places in South Carolina
Buildings and structures in Pickens County, South Carolina
National Register of Historic Places in Pickens County, South Carolina
Pickens, South Carolina